Minutes and Seconds: Live is the first full-length live album by English singer Alison Moyet, released on 10 November 2014 by Cooking Vinyl. The album features live cuts from her 2013–2014 The Minutes Tour. While the majority of the set consists of new material from her 2013 album, The Minutes, the set also includes songs from Moyet's back catalogue, including songs by her former band, Yazoo. The album's recordings were captured at various venues. Moyet added and discarded songs throughout the run of the tour, many of which did not make this release.

Track listing

Personnel
Credits for Minutes and Seconds – Live adapted from liner notes.

 Alison Moyet – vocals
 John Garden – MD, keyboards, guitars, programming
 Sean McGhee – backing vocals, synthesizer, guitar, programming
 Guy Sigsworth, Chris Elms, John Garden and Sean McGhee – arrangement of tracks 1, 2, 4, 7, 9, 11, 13
 John Garden and Sean McGhee – arrangement of tracks 3, 5, 6, 8, 10, 12
 Chris Fillery – recording
 Sean McGhee and John Garden – mixing
 Simon Heyworth and Andy Miles – mastering

External links
Announcement of release by Cooking Vinyl

Alison Moyet's official website

2014 live albums
Alison Moyet albums
Cooking Vinyl live albums